Beideman is a neighborhood name in the East Camden section of the City of Camden, New Jersey. According to the 2000 U.S. census, Beideman has a population of 5,677.  

The neighborhood name Beideman originates from a prominent family that lived there, with several notable members including Benjamin C. Beideman and Horace B. Beideman. The name Beideman has been frequently misspelled as "Biedman" or "Biedeman".  The East Camden neighborhoods of Beideman and Pavonia are also considered part of the neighborhood of Cramer Hill.

References

Camden County, New Jersey
Neighborhoods in Camden, New Jersey